Schuyler County is a county in the U.S. state of New York. As of the 2020 census, the population was 17,898, making it the second-least populous county in New York. The county seat is the village of Watkins Glen. The name is in honor of General Philip Schuyler, one of the four major generals in the Continental Army in the American Revolutionary War.

History
When counties were established in New York State in 1683, the present Schuyler County was part of Albany County. This was an enormous county, including the northern part of New York State as well as all of the present State of Vermont and, in theory, extending westward to the Pacific Ocean. This county was reduced in size on July 3, 1766, by the creation of Cumberland County, and further on March 16, 1770, by the creation of Gloucester County, both containing territory now in Vermont.

On March 12, 1772, what was left of Albany County was split into three parts, one remaining under the name Albany County. One of the other pieces, Tryon County, contained the western portion (and thus, since no western boundary was specified, theoretically still extended west to the Pacific). Tryon County's eastern boundary was approximately five miles west of the present city of Schenectady, and the county included the western part of the Adirondack Mountains and the area west of the West Branch of the Delaware River. The area then designated as Tryon County now includes 37 counties of New York State. The county was named for William Tryon, colonial governor of New York.

In the years prior to 1776, most of the Loyalists in Tryon County fled to Canada. In 1784, following the peace treaty that ended the American Revolutionary War, Tryon County's name was changed to Montgomery County in honor of the general, Richard Montgomery, who had captured several places in Canada and died attempting to capture the city of Quebec, replacing the name of the hated British governor.

In 1789, Ontario County was split off from Montgomery. The actual area split off from Montgomery County was much larger than the present county, also including the present Allegany, Cattaraugus, Chautauqua, Erie, Genesee, Livingston, Monroe, Niagara, Orleans, Steuben, Wyoming, Yates, and part of Schuyler and Wayne counties.

Herkimer and Tioga counties were two of three counties split off from Montgomery County (the other being Otsego County) in 1791.

In 1794, Onondaga County was formed by the splitting of Herkimer County. This county was larger than the present Onondaga County, however, including the present Cayuga, Seneca, and Tompkins counties.

On March 8, 1796, Steuben County was created, split off from Ontario County. It was larger than the present county, however.

In 1798, Chemung County was formed from Tioga County, but the county at that time was rather larger than the present county, containing a portion of what would later become Schuyler County.

In 1799, Cayuga County was formed by the splitting of Onondaga County. This county was, however, much larger than the present Cayuga County. It then included the present Seneca and Tompkins counties, as well as part of what would become Schuyler County.

In 1804, Seneca County was formed by the splitting of Cayuga County. Then in 1817, in turn, a portion of Seneca County was combined with a piece of the remainder of Cayuga County to form Tompkins County.

In 1823, Steuben County was reduced in size by the combination of a portion of the county with a portion of Ontario County to form Yates County.

On April 17, 1854, portions of Steuben, Chemung and Tompkins counties  were combined to form Schuyler County.

Geography

Schuyler County is in the western part of New York State, west of Ithaca at the southern end of Seneca Lake.

The Finger Lakes National Forest is in the north part of the county.

Adjacent counties
 Seneca County - north
 Tompkins County - east
 Chemung County - south
 Steuben County - west
 Yates County - northwest

Major highways
  New York State Route 14
  New York State Route 79
  New York State Route 224
  New York State Route 226
  New York State Route 414

National protected area
 Finger Lakes National Forest (part)

Demographics

As of the census of 2000, there were 19,224 people, 7,374 households, and 5,191 families residing in the county.  The population density was 58 people per square mile (23/km2).  There were 9,181 housing units at an average density of 28 per square mile (11/km2).  The racial makeup of the county was 96.48% White, 1.45% African American, 0.40% Native American, 0.29% Asian, 0.03% Pacific Islander, 0.36% from other races, and 0.99% from two or more races. Hispanic or Latino of any race were 1.22% of the population. 17.3% were of German, 15.5% English, 13.9% Irish, 11.8% American and 11.4% Italian ancestry according to Census 2000. 97.1% spoke English and 1.1% Spanish as their first language.

There were 7,374 households, out of which 32.30% had children under the age of 18 living with them, 55.70% were married couples living together, 9.70% had a female householder with no husband present, and 29.60% were non-families. 23.60% of all households were made up of individuals, and 10.70% had someone living alone who was 65 years of age or older.  The average household size was 2.52 and the average family size was 2.96.

In the county, the population was spread out, with 25.30% under the age of 18, 7.90% from 18 to 24, 26.60% from 25 to 44, 25.40% from 45 to 64, and 14.60% who were 65 years of age or older.  The median age was 39 years. For every 100 females there were 100.50 males.  For every 100 females age 18 and over, there were 96.60 males.

The median income for a household in the county was $36,010, and the median income for a family was $41,441. Males had a median income of $31,549 versus $21,928 for females. The per capita income for the county was $17,039.  About 8.80% of families and 11.80% of the population were below the poverty line, including 17.10% of those under age 18 and 6.20% of those age 65 or over.

2020 Census

Communities

Larger Settlements
All larger settlements are villages

† - County Seat

Towns

 Catharine
 Cayuta
 Dix
 Hector
 Montour
 Orange
 Reading
 Tyrone

Hamlets
 Mecklenburg
 Perry City
 Valois https://valoisny.us

Politics

|}

See also

 List of counties in New York
 National Register of Historic Places listings in Schuyler County, New York

References

Further reading

External links
  Schuyler County government
   Schuyler County information
 
  Historical resources for Schuyler County

 
1854 establishments in New York (state)
Counties of Appalachia
Populated places established in 1854